Poddar Nagar is a neighbourhood located in South Kolkata in the city of Kolkata, West Bengal, India. The adjacent neighbourhoods to the locality include Jadavpur, South City, Katju Nagar, Jodhpur Park, Lake Gardens, Bikramgarh and Golf Green.

References

Neighbourhoods in Kolkata